Joseph Bernard Stanley (April 2, 1881 – September 13, 1967) was a Major League Baseball pitcher. He played all or part of seven season in the majors, between 1897 and 1909.Stanley debuted in the major leagues as a pitcher at the age of 16 for the National League's Washington Senators. He pitched just two-thirds of an inning, and did not appear in the majors again for five years. Over the rest of his MLB career, he pitched just twice more.After his major league career, Stanley continued to play minor league baseball until . He also managed the Springfield Reapers (1913–14) and Lynchburg Shoemakers (1917).

Sources

Major League Baseball outfielders
Washington Senators (1891–1899) players
Washington Senators (1901–1960) players
Boston Beaneaters players
Chicago Cubs players
Newport News Shipbuilders players
New Orleans Pelicans (baseball) players
Raleigh Senators players
Louisville Colonels (minor league) players
Springfield Reapers players
Erie Sailors players
Muskegon Reds players
Minor league baseball managers
Baseball players from Washington, D.C.
19th-century baseball players
1881 births
1967 deaths